Celaenorrhinus proxima, commonly known as the common black sprite, is a species of butterfly in the family Hesperiidae. It is found in Guinea, Sierra Leone, Liberia, Ivory Coast, Ghana, Togo, Nigeria, Cameroon, Democratic Republic of the Congo, Sudan, Uganda, Kenya and Tanzania. The habitat consists of forests and heavy woodland.

The larvae feed on Mimulopsis species.

Subspecies
Celaenorrhinus proxima proxima (Cameroon to Sudan, Uganda, western Tanzania, western Kenya)
Celaenorrhinus proxima maesseni Berger, 1976 (Guinea, Sierra Leone, Liberia, Ivory Coast, Ghana, Togo, Nigeria, western Cameroon)

References

Butterflies described in 1877
proxima
Butterflies of Africa
Taxa named by Paul Mabille